American burlesque is a genre of variety show derived from elements of Victorian burlesque, music hall and minstrel shows. Burlesque became popular in America in the late 1860s and slowly evolved to feature ribald comedy and female nudity. By the late 1920s, the striptease element overshadowed the comedy and subjected burlesque to extensive local legislation. Burlesque gradually lost popularity beginning in the 1940s. A number of producers sought to capitalize on nostalgia for the entertainment by recreating burlesque on the stage and in Hollywood films from the 1930s to the 1960s. There has been a resurgence of interest in this format since the 1990s.

Literary and theatrical origins

The term "burlesque" more generally means a literary, dramatic or musical work intended to cause laughter by caricaturing the manner or spirit of serious works, or by ludicrous treatment of their subjects. Burlesque in literature and in theatre through the 19th century was intentionally ridiculous in that it imitated several styles and combined imitations of certain authors and artists with absurd descriptions. Burlesque depended on the reader's (or listener's) knowledge of the subject to make its intended effect, and a high degree of literacy was taken for granted.

Victorian burlesque, sometimes known as "travesty" or "extravaganza", was popular in London theatres between the 1830s and the 1890s. It took the form of musical theatre parody in which a well-known opera, play or ballet was adapted into a broad comic play, usually a musical play, often risqué in style, mocking the theatrical and musical conventions and styles of the original work, and quoting or pastiching text or music from the original work. The comedy often stemmed from the incongruity and absurdity of the classical subjects, with realistic historical dress and settings, being juxtaposed with the modern activities portrayed by the actors. The dialogue was generally written in rhyming couplets, liberally peppered with bad puns. A typical example from a burlesque of Macbeth: Macbeth and Banquo enter under an umbrella, and the witches greet them with "Hail! hail! hail!" Macbeth asks Banquo, "What mean these salutations, noble thane?" and is told, "These showers of 'Hail' anticipate your 'reign'". A staple of theatrical burlesque was the display of attractive women in travesty roles, dressed in tights to show off their legs, but the plays themselves were seldom more than modestly risqué.

History

19th century
There were three main influences on American burlesque in its early years: Victorian burlesque, "leg shows" and minstrel shows. British-style burlesques had been successfully presented in New York as early as the 1840s.

Burlesque in the United States is believed to have begun in New York with the arrival from England of Lydia Thompson's burlesque troupe, "The British Blondes". It was the most popular entertainment in New York during the 1868–1869 theatrical season: "The eccentricities of pantomime and burlesque – with their curious combination of comedy, parody, satire, improvisation, song and dance, variety acts, cross-dressing, extravagant stage effects, risqué jokes and saucy costumes – while familiar enough to British audiences, took New York by storm." Unfortunately, “the female audiences for burlesque did not last for long. In the summer of 1869 a wave of ‘anti-burlesque hysteria’ in the New York press frightened away the middle-class audiences ... and sent the Thompson troupe prematurely packing for a national tour”. After this untimely closure, backlash against burlesque continued to grow. Thompson's shows were described as a “disgraceful spectacle of padded legs jiggling and wriggling in the insensate follies and indecencies of the hour”.  The New York Times consistently expressed its disgust of burlesque, even headlining an article with the plea “Exit British Burlesque”.

"Leg" shows, such as the musical extravaganza The Black Crook (1866), became popular around the same time. The influence of the minstrel show soon followed; one of the first American burlesque troupes was the Rentz-Santley Novelty and Burlesque Company, created in 1870 by Michael B. Leavitt, who had earlier feminized the minstrel show with his group Madame Rentz's Female Minstrels. American burlesque rapidly adopted the minstrel show's tripartite structure: part one was composed of songs and dances rendered by a female company, interspersed with low comedy from male comedians. Part two featured various short specialties and olios in which the women did not appear. The show's finish was a grand finale. Sometimes the entertainment was followed by a boxing or wrestling match.

By the 1880s, the four distinguishing characteristics of American burlesque had evolved:
Minimal costuming, often focusing on the female form.
Sexually suggestive dialogue, dance, plot lines and staging.
Quick-witted humor laced with puns, but lacking complexity.
Short routines or sketches with minimal plot cohesion across a show.

‘From 1880 to 1890 burlesque gained considerably in popularity and had developed into a definite form of entertainment, with a first part, olio and afterpiece or burlesque. Most of the shows that were rated as burlesque shows between 1870 and 1880 were partly of the minstrel type, and many contained casts entirely composed of women. Among the shows organized from 1880 to 1890 were the Ida Siddon’s Female Mastodons & Burlesque Co.—Sam T. Jack’s “Lily Clay’s" Adamless Eden Gaiety Co.—Lillie Hall’s Burlesquers—Madame Girard Gyer’s English Novelty Co.—Bob Manchester’s “Night Owls"—May Howard’s Co. (managed by Harry Morris, her husband and Tom Miaco)—the “City Club,” organized by the same managers—Sam T. Jack’s “Creole Burlesquers,” an all-negro show—Fay Foster Co., organized by Joe Oppenheimer—Rose Hill English Folly Co., managed by George W. Rice and Charles Barton—Weber and Fields’ Vaudeville Club—John S. Grieves’ Burlesquers—Boom’s “Model Burlesquers,”—“Parisian Folly”—and John H. Smiths’ “Henry Burlesquers,” in which McIntyre and Heath appeared.’

1900–1920
Burlesque in the first two decades of the 20th century was dominated by the Columbia Amusement Company. Also known as the Columbia Wheel, it produced over three dozen touring shows each year that rotated through an equal number of affiliated theaters. Columbia crushed smaller circuits or bought them outright, and organized a subsidiary circuit, the American Wheel, which played less prominent theaters and didn't censor performers as strictly as the main wheel. Before World War I, Columbia burlesque was generally family-friendly. Performers included Bert Lahr, Fannie Brice, and Bobby Clark, Leon Errol, and Jay C. Flippen, all of whom eventually left burlesque for Broadway musical comedies and revues.

1920–1930
Columbia's American Wheel subsidiary went bankrupt in 1922, but executives and producers formed a new, independent circuit, Mutual, that took inspiration from modern Broadway revues like Earl Carroll's Vanities and the Ziegfeld Follies. Many performers and producers abandoned Columbia, which was seen as old-fashioned and in decline. At its peak, Mutual sent up to 50 shows on the road each year to cycle through as many affiliated theaters. Mutual's shows were more risque than Columbia's, but not as racy as shows mounted by local stock burlesque theaters such as the Minskys at the National Winter Garden on the Lower East Side. The popular burlesque show of this period eventually evolved into the striptease which became the dominant ingredient of burlesque by the mid 1920s. The transition from traditional burlesque to striptease is depicted in the film The Night They Raided Minsky's (1968). Several performers claimed or have been given credit for being the first stripteaser. Comedians Bud Abbott, Lou Costello (not yet a team), Harry Steppe, Joe Penner, Billy Gilbert, and Rags Ragland, as well as stripteasers Ann Corio, Hinda Wausau, and Gypsy Rose Lee performed in Mutual shows.

1930s and decline
Mutual collapsed in 1931 during the Great Depression. As legitimate Broadway shows closed, stock burlesque impresarios like the Minskys expanded out of working class neighborhoods and into theaters in and around Times Square. Stock burlesque companies multiplied in other cities and snatched up former Mutual talent. By the late 1930s, clergy, anti-vice factions and local businesses cracked down on burlesque and began its downfall. Shows had changed from ribald ensemble performances of skits and musical numbers to a succession of solo stripteasers. In New York, Mayor Fiorello LaGuardia clamped down on burlesque beginning in 1937 and effectively put it out of business by the early 1940s. Burlesque lingered on elsewhere in the U.S., increasingly neglected, and by the 1970s, with nudity commonplace in theatres, American burlesque reached "its final shabby demise".

Burlesque performances
Burlesque performances originally included comic sketches lampooning authority, the upper classes and high art, such as opera, Shakespearean drama, and classical ballet. The genre developed alongside vaudeville and ran on competing circuits. Possibly due to historical social tensions between the upper classes and lower classes of society, much of the humor and entertainment of later American burlesque focused on lowbrow and ribald subjects. In 1937, Epes W. Sargent wrote in Variety that, "Burlesque is elastic; more so, perhaps, than any other form in theatrical entertainment", meaning that burlesque performers didn't need to perform in a certain way. The performers could structure their show how they wanted.

Charlie Chaplin (who starred in the 1915 film Burlesque on Carmen) noted in 1910: "Chicago ... had a fierce pioneer gaiety that enlivened the senses, yet underlying it throbbed masculine loneliness. Counteracting this somatic ailment was a national distraction known as the burlesque show, consisting of a coterie of rough-and-tumble comedians supported by twenty or more chorus girls. Some were pretty, others shopworn. Some of the comedians were funny, most of the shows were smutty harem comedies – coarse and cynical affairs".

Burlesque on film

Burlesque shows have been depicted in numerous Hollywood films starting with Applause, a 1929 black-and-white backstage musical talkie directed by Rouben Mamoulian. Others include  King of Burlesque (1936), starring Warner Baxter; Lady of Burlesque (1943) starring Barbara Stanwyck; Delightfully Dangerous (1945) starring Constance Moore; Two Sisters from Boston (1946), starring Kathryn Grayson; Queen of Burlesque (1946), starring Evelyn Ankers;  Linda, Be Good (1947), starring Elyse Knox; and She's Working Her Way Through College (1952), starring Virginia Mayo. Gypsy (1962), starring Natalie Wood, and The Night They Raided Minsky's (1968), starring Jason Robards, depicted burlesque of the 1920s and 1930s. Other films that include burlesque characters include Ball of Fire, a 1941 screwball comedy starring Gary Cooper and Barbara Stanwyck. Additionally, many of the comedies of Bud Abbott and Lou Costello feature classic burlesque routines, such as "The Lemon Table," "Crazy House," and "Slowly I Turned/Niagra Falls."

Low-budget documentations of extant burlesque shows began with Hollywood Revels (1946), where a regular production was staged in a theater and photographed from a distance. In 1947, film producer W. Merle Connell re-staged the action in a studio, where he could control the camerawork, lighting and sound, providing close-ups and other studio photographic and editorial techniques. His 1951 production French Follies recreates a classic American burlesque presentation. Some figures from the 1950s indicate that burlesque films could cost upwards of $50,000 to produce, but Dan Sonney states that most only cost about $15,000 because they were shot quickly and often done in less than a day. Others filmed at the Follies Theatre in Los Angeles include Too Hot to Handle (1950), and Kiss Me Baby (1957).

Later, other producers entered the field, using color photography and even location work. Naughty New Orleans (1954) is an example of burlesque entertainment on film, equally showcasing girls and gags, although it shifts the venue from a burlesque-house stage to a popular nightclub. Photographer Irving Klaw filmed a very profitable series of burlesque features, usually featuring star pin-up girl Bettie Page and various lowbrow comedians (including future TV star Joe E. Ross). Page's most famous features are Striporama (1953), Varietease (1954) and Teaserama (1955). These films, as their titles imply, were only teasing the viewer: the girls wore revealing costumes, but there was never any nudity. In the late 1950s, however, provocative films emerged, sometimes using a "nudist colony" format, and the relatively tame burlesque-show film died out.

Stage shows and revivals
A Broadway musical called Burlesque opened September 1, 1927 and ran until July 14, 1928. Top Banana, a musical with music and lyrics by Johnny Mercer and book by Hy Kraft and starring Phil Silvers premiered on Broadway in 1951. The original Broadway production of "Gypsy" opened on May 21, 1959 and closed on March 25, 1961 after 702 performances. In 1962, famed strip teaser Ann Corio put together a nostalgic off-Broadway show, This Was Burlesque, which she directed and in which also performed. (In 1968, she wrote a book with the same title.) Corio's show toured for almost two decades. In 1979, the Broadway musical Sugar Babies, recreated a Mutual-era show. A loose stage adaptation of The Night They Raided Minsky's, called Minsky's, opened on February 6, 2009, at the Ahmanson Theatre, Los Angeles, and ran three weeks. A 2013 play, The Nance, written by Douglas Carter Beane, focuses on a camp stock character in a 1930s burlesque troupe.

Neo-Burlesque

A new generation nostalgic for the spectacle and perceived glamour of the old times determined to bring burlesque back. This revival was pioneered independently in the early 1990s by Billie Madley's "Cinema" and later with Ami Goodheart in "Dutch Weismann's Follies" revues in New York, Michelle Carr's "The Velvet Hammer" troupe in Los Angeles, and The Shim-Shamettes in New Orleans. Ivan Kane's Royal Jelly Burlesque Nightclub at Revel Atlantic City opened in 2012. Inspired by old time stars like Sally Rand, Tempest Storm, Gypsy Rose Lee, and Lili St. Cyr, more recent performers include Dita Von Teese, Julie Atlas Muz, and Anne McDonald.  Agitprop groups such as Cabaret Red Light have included political satire and performance art in their acts.

Today, Neo-Burlesque has taken many forms, but all have the common trait of honoring one or more of burlesque's previous incarnations, with acts including striptease, expensive costumes, bawdy humor, cabaret, and comedy/variety acts. Although neo-burlesque acts honor previous acts, they often lack elements of parody, and political commentary that was commonplace in traditional burlesque. There are modern burlesque performers and shows all over the world, and annual conventions such as the Vancouver International Burlesque Festival, the New York Burlesque Festival created by burlesque star Angie Pontani and Jen Gapay, and the Miss Exotic World Pageant are held. In 2008, The New York Times noted that burlesque had made a comeback in the city's art performance scene.

A 2010 musical film Burlesque, starring Christina Aguilera and Cher, attempted to capitalize on the current revival of burlesque. However, it received mixed reviews and a score of 37% on movie website Rotten Tomatoes. Critics found it "perversely tame" and "closer to your grandmother’s fan dance than to the neo-burlesque revues that began popping up in the early 1990s". Additionally, it "wags its derrière, in the direction of new burlesque, but it’s strictly old school ... with a story line that had already gathered dust by ... 1933."

Notable stars, writers, and agents

 Abbott and Costello
 Jack Albertson
 Robert Alda
 Morey Amsterdam
 Michael "Atters" Attree
 Candy Barr
 Irving Benson
 Milton Berle
 Immodesty Blaize
 Bella Blue
 Ben Blue
 Jac Bowie
 Fanny Brice
 Sherry Britton
 Red Buttons
 Jack Cameron
 Jack Carter
 Ann Corio
 Catherine D'lish
 Danny Dayton
 Jami Deadly
 Millie DeLeon
 Joe DeRita
 Phyllis Dixey
 Jimmy Durante
 Leon Errol
 Jade Esteban Estrada
 Joey Faye
 W. C. Fields
 Dwight Fiske
 Fanne Foxe
 Gentry de Paris
 Jackie Gleason 
 John Grant
 Gilda Gray
 Jennie Lee
 Dixie Evans
 Billy Hagan
 Margie Hart
 Bob Hope
 Al Jolson
 Bambi Jones
 Danny Kaye
 Bert Lahr
 Michelle L'amour
 Pinky Lee
 Gypsy Rose Lee
 Al Lewis
 Lola the Vamp
 Jayne Mansfield
 Angelique Pettyjohn
 Minsky Malone
 Missy Malone
 April March
 Pauline Markham
 Dirty Martini
 Tim Moore
 Chesty Morgan
 Julie Atlas Muz
 Kitten Natividad
 Olsen and Johnson
 Bettie Page
 Gloria Pall
 Molly Picon
 Miss Polly Rae
 Angie Pontani
 Rags Ragland
 Sally Rand
 Alan Reed
 Liz Renay
 Benny Rubin
 Lili St. Cyr
 Satan's Angel
 Tura Satana
 Phil Silvers
 Red Skelton
 Arnold Stang
 Blaze Starr
 Tempest Storm
 Dita Von Teese
 Evelyn West
 Mae West
 Mollie Williams
 Henny Youngman
 Joe Yule

Notable burlesque festivals

 Helsinki Burlesque Festival, Helsinki, Finland
 Miss Exotic World, Las Vegas, U.S
 Moisture Festival, Seattle, U.S.
 New Orleans Burlesque Festival, Louisiana, U.S.
 New York Burlesque Festival, New York City, U.S.

See also
 Behind the Burly Q, a 2010 documentary about the golden age of burlesque.
 Burlesque Hall of Fame
 Minsky's
 Womanless wedding
 Beef Trust (burlesque)

Notes

References
 Abrams, M. H. (1999) A Glossary of Literary Terms. Seventh edition. Fort Worth, TX: Harcourt Brace College Publishers
 Adams, William Davenport (1904)  A dictionary of the drama London: Chatto & Windus
 Allan, Kirsty L. A Guide to Classical Burlesque – Funny Ha Ha or Funny Peculiar?
 Allan, Kirsty L. and Charms, G. Diamonds From the Rough – The Darker Side of American Burlesque striptease
 
 Baldwin, Michelle. Burlesque and the New Bump-n-Grind
 Briggeman, Jane (2009) Burlesque: A Living History. BearManor Media, 2009. 
 DiNardo, Kelly. "Gilded Lili: Lili St. Cyr and the Striptease Mystique"; Archive of articles, video, pictures and interviews about neo-burlesque.
 Kenrick, John. A History of The Musical Burlesque
 
 
 Zeidman, Irving: The American Burlesque Show. Hawthorn Books, Inc 1967, .

External links

 Ruckus! American Entertainments at the Turn of the Twentieth Century From the collection of the Beinecke Rare Book and Manuscript Library at Yale University
 Classic Burlesque: We Aim to Tease – slideshow by Life magazine
 
 History of Burlesque at Musicals101.com, The Cyber Encyclopedia of Musical Theatre, TV and Film
 "A Guide to Classical Burlesque – Funny Ha Ha or Funny Peculiar?" Allan, K., The Curious Adventures of Kittie
 The Golden Days of Burlesque Historical Society

American
Dance in the United States
Performing arts in the United States